The Hockey East Scoring Champion is an annual award given out at the conclusion of the Hockey East regular season to the skater who scored the most points in conference games during the regular season.

The Scoring Champion was first awarded in 1985 and every year thereafter. It was shared four times, between Tom Nolan and Marty Reasoner in 1998, Ryan Shannon and Tony Voce in 2004, James Marcou and Colin Wilson in 2009, and Bobby Butler and Gustav Nyquist in 2010.

In 2022–23, Lane Huston became the first Defenceman to win the award in league history.

The current record for most points scored in conference play during a season is 74 points, held by Craig Janney of Boston College, set in 1987.

Only David Emma, Chris Drury and Johnny Gaudreau have won the award twice, all in consecutive years.

Award winners

Winners by school

Winners by position

See also
Hockey East Awards

References

General

Specific

External links
Hockey East Awards (Incomplete)

College ice hockey trophies and awards in the United States